Loose in London is a 1953 comedy film starring The Bowery Boys. The film was released on May 24, 1953 by Allied Artists and is the thirtieth film in the series.

Plot
Sach receives notice that a dying British earl is his long-lost relative.  He travels there with the rest of the gang after exchanging his free first-class ticket for four economy class tickets.  Meanwhile, Louie, who is on board to say goodbye, gets locked in a closet and becomes a stowaway.  When the boys arrive in London they are treated with disdain from the earl's other relatives, who are secretly plotting to kill the earl.  Sach livens up the earl by telling him to eat ice cream instead of his medicine, and generally making him laugh.  The earl's health begins to improve and he decides to make Sach his sole heir.  The other relatives decide they need to kill off the earl immediately, but are foiled by the boys.  Unfortunately just before the earl is to sign the paperwork making Sach the heir, his lawyer arrives and informs them that he made an error and Sach isn't really his relative.

Cast

The Bowery Boys
 Leo Gorcey as Terrance Aloysius 'Slip' Mahoney
 Huntz Hall as Horace Debussy 'Sach' Jones
 David Gorcey as Chuck Anderson (Credited as David Condon)
 Bennie Bartlett as Butch Williams

Remaining cast
 Bernard Gorcey as Louie Dumbrowski 
 Walter Kingsford as Sir Percy, Earl of Walsingham
 Norma Varden as Aunt Agatha
 Angela Greene as Lady Marcia
 Matthew Boulton as Ames
 John Rogers as Ship Steward

Production
The film was originally planned to be produced in 1950, under then title Knights of the Square Table.  This is the first film in the series where Chuck and Butch are given last names, 'Anderson' and 'Williams', respectively.

Home media
Warner Archives released the film on made-to-order DVD in the United States as part of "The Bowery Boys, Volume Two" on April 9, 2013.

References

External links
 
 
 
 

1953 comedy films
1953 films
American black-and-white films
American comedy films
Bowery Boys films
Films directed by Edward Bernds
Allied Artists films
Films set in London
1950s English-language films
1950s American films